Nguyen Van Toan may refer to:

Nguyễn Văn Toàn (general)
Nguyễn Văn Toàn (footballer), footballer born 1996
 Nguyễn Văn Toản, footballer born 1999